|}

The Brigadier Gerard Stakes is a Group 3 flat horse race in Great Britain open to horses aged four years or older. It is run at Sandown Park over a distance of 1 mile 1 furlong and 209 yards, and it is scheduled to take place each year in late May or early June.

The event was established in 1953, and it was originally called the Coronation Stakes. Its title commemorated the coronation of Queen Elizabeth II.

The race was renamed the Brigadier Gerard Stakes in 1973. This was in honour of Brigadier Gerard, a recently retired champion racehorse whose victories included the Westbury Stakes (later re-named the Gordon Richards Stakes) and the Eclipse Stakes at Sandown Park. The 2021 race was run in memory of Joe Mercer, who died the week before the race and who rode Brigadier Gerard in all his races.

Records
Most successful horse (2 wins):
 Chamier – 1954, 1955
 Tacitus – 1963, 1964
 Jellaby – 1977, 1979

Leading jockey (7 wins):
 Ryan Moore - Workforce (2011), Carlton House (2012), Time Test (2016), Autocratic (2017), Poet's Word (2018), Regal Reality (2019), Bay Bridge (2022)

Leading trainer (12 wins):
 Sir Michael Stoute – Stagecraft (1991), Opera House (1992), Pilsudski (1996), Insatiable (1998), Notnowcato (2006), Workforce (2011), Carlton House (2012), Autocratic (2017), Poet's Word (2018), Regal Reality (2019), Bay Bridge (2022)

Winners since 1977

Earlier winners

 1953: Guersant
 1954: Chamier
 1955: Chamier
 1956: Tribord
 1957: Gilles de Retz
 1958: Arctic Explorer
 1959: Aggressor
 1960: Lucky Guy
 1961: Petite Etoile
 1962: Cipriani
 1963: Tacitus
 1964: Tacitus
 1965: Philanderer
 1966: Super Sam
 1967: Busted
 1968: Royal Palace
 1969: Connaught
 1970: Hotfoot
 1971: Pembroke Castle
 1972: Stubbs' Gazette
 1973: Scottish Rifle
 1974: Ksar
 1975: Rymer
 1976: Anne's Pretender

See also
 Horse racing in Great Britain
 List of British flat horse races

References

 Paris-Turf:
 Racing Post:

 galopp-sieger.de – Brigadier Gerard Stakes (ex Coronation Stakes).
 ifhaonline.org – International Federation of Horseracing Authorities – Brigadier Gerard Stakes (2019).
 pedigreequery.com – Brigadier Gerard Stakes – Sandown Park.
 

Flat races in Great Britain
Sandown Park Racecourse
Open middle distance horse races
Recurring sporting events established in 1953
1953 establishments in England